Scolecoseps litipoensis, also known commonly as the Litipo sand skink, is a species of lizard in the family Scincidae. The species is endemic to Tanzania.

Geographic range
S. litipoensis is found in the Litipo Forest Reserve in southeastern Tanzania.

Habitat

Reproduction
The mode of reproduction of S. litipoensis is unknown.

References

Further reading
Broadley DG (1995). "A new species of Scolecoseps (Reptilia: Scincidae) from southeastern Tanzania". Amphibia-Reptilia 16 (3): 241–244. (Scolecoseps litipoensis, new species).
Spawls S, Howell K, Hinkel H, Menegon M (2018). Field Guide to East African Reptiles, Second Edition. London: Bloomsbury Natural History. 624 pp. . (Scolecoseps litipoensis, p. 178).

litipoensis
Reptiles of Tanzania
Reptiles described in 1995
Taxa named by Donald George Broadley